Blakehurst High School is a Government-funded co-educational comprehensive and specialist secondary day school with speciality in languages, located in Blakehurst, a southern suburb of Sydney, New South Wales, Australia.

Established in 1960, the school enrolled approximately 1,110 students in 2018, from Year 7 to Year 12, of whom one percent identified as Indigenous Australians and 85 percent were from a language background other than English. The school is operated by the NSW Department of Education in accordance with a curriculum developed by the New South Wales Education Standards Authority; the principal is Sophie Kapsimalis.

Student composition
The school has around 1138 students, 80 teaching staff and 30 non-teaching staff. 40% of the students are from an Anglo-Celtic background and 81.8% of students identify as having a non-English speaking background, many of whom were born in Australia. Of these students, the largest group is of Chinese background, 30% of the school population, and the second largest is Greek at 10%. Of the remaining 60%, there are over 40 language groups represented, including one Egyptian.

In 2000 the school was award the title Specialist Languages High School as part of the Outstanding Schools Program.

Notable alumni
 Justice Robert McClellandJudge of the Family Court of Australia, former politician who served as the Attorney-General of Australia and Member for Barton

Notable former teaching staff 
 Barry Collierformer politician, Member for Miranda (1999–2011 & 2013–2015), social science teacher, 1982 to 1986

See also

 List of government schools in New South Wales
 Education in Australia

References

External links
 

Public high schools in Sydney
Educational institutions established in 1960
1960 establishments in Australia